The Sidek badminton family is a Malaysian family with a significant history within professional badminton. The patriarch of the family was an avid badminton fan, Sidek Abdullah Kamar (1936–2005), who himself was a former player turned senior coach. He started to train his sons from an early age at their house in Banting.

As soon as his sons were spotted by Khoo Teng Yuen, a BAM coach, he transferred them to a prestigious secondary school known as Victoria Institution in Kuala Lumpur, where he (Khoo) was based. The training ultimately culminated in regaining the Thomas Cup in 1992 after a lapse of 25 years.

The five Sidek brothers, who were also world-class players, began their run of success in the early 1980s. They won titles and medals in major tournaments, including All-England, World Cup, Olympic Games, and many big open tournaments. In 1985, the Sidek family made history when they became the largest sibling group ever to represent the country abroad in the same sporting event. Misbun, Razif, Jalani, Rahman, and Rashid were all selected to compete at the Hong Kong Open. They are also known as the founder of the infamous “S” serve, which caused a deceptively erratic shuttle movement, which confounded their opponents and officials alike. The serve caused much uproar and was eventually banned by the International Badminton Federation (IBF).

As of 2014, the only Sidek to actively play in the international scene is Misbun's son Misbun Ramdan Misbun.

Members 
 Mohmed Misbun - 17 February 1960
 Mohamad Razif - 29 May 1962
 Mohd Jalani - 10 November 1963
 Abdul Rahman -  20 September 1965
 Abdul Rashid -  8 July 1968

Major achievements 
MISBUN - World Cup runner-up (1982), All-England runner-up (1986), Thomas Cup runner-up (1988)

RAZIF & JALANI - All-England champion (1982), World Grand Prix Finals gold medallist (1986, 1988, 1989, 1991), World Championships silver medallist (1987), World Cup gold medalist (1990, 1991), Thomas Cup champions (1992), Olympic Games bronze medallist (1992), Asian Championships gold medallist (1992)

RAHMAN - Thomas Cup champions (1992), Asian Championships bronze medallist (1992)

RASHID - Asian Championships gold medallist (1991, 1992), Thomas Cup champions (1992), World Grand Prix Finals gold medallist (1992), Olympic Games bronze medallist (1996), All-England runner-up (1996)

In popular culture
Sidek and his sons' life story was published in a biographical comic book, entitled Anak-Anak Sidek (The Sidek Brothers), which was published by Pengedaran JAS Sdn Bhd, a company owned by Jalani's former spouse, Raja Azmi. The comic was later adapted into an animated series of the same title which aired on RTM. All of Sidek brothers, except Razif, became the board of directors and executive producers for both comic and the animated series.

References 

People from Selangor
Malaysian Muslims
Malaysian people of Malay descent
Malaysian families
Malaysian badminton players